The 2023 CIS Games is the second edition of the CIS Games. It is expected to take place in Belarus in 2023. Athletes from Russia and other member states of the Commonwealth of Independent States (CIS) are expected to compete in the games.

Preparation 
On 24 March 2022, the organizing committee has been created in Belarus to hold the II Games of the CIS countries in 2023.

The games

Ceremonies

Sports

Participating nations 
 
 
  (host)

Medal table

References 

Commonwealth of Independent States
2023 in Belarusian sport